The Church of Our Lady of Shkodra is an Albanian Roman Catholic church located in Hartsdale, New York.

History 
The origins of the Albanian Catholic Church in New York start with the establishment of the Albanian-American Catholic League in 16 June 1962. In 1969, the League acquired a center on 4221 Park Avenue, Bronx, and renamed itself to the Our Lady of Good Counsel Albanian Catholic Center. The first mass was held on Christmas of 1969, while the church was officially opened on 12 April 1970, and on 19 August 1973, it was dedicated by cardinal Terence Cooke. On 1973, the second Albanian Catholic Center, named St. Paul and St. Peter Albanian Catholic Center was founded in  Eastchester Road, Bronx.

On 20 February 1987, with the approval of Archdiocese of New York, the two Albanian Catholic Centers "Our Lady of Good Counsel" and "St. Paul and St. Peter" were merged into  Albanian Catholic Church of Our Lady of Shkodra. On 28 September 1989, cardinal John O'Connor established the first Albanian Catholic parish in the United States, and named Rrok Mirdita as the first pastor.

The construction of the church building started in 3 December 1995, and the first mass was held on the Christmas of 1998. On 25 April 1999, on the Fest of Our Lady of Shkodra, the Church of Our Lady of Shkodra was consecrated by John O'Connor, Archbishop of New York.

List of pastors 
In chronological order, the following priests have served as pastor of the church:

 Rev. Rrok Mirdita (1989–1993)
 Rev. Pjetër Popaj (1993–present)

See also 

 List of churches in the Roman Catholic Archdiocese of New York

References

External links 

 

Roman Catholic churches in New York (state)
Churches in Westchester County, New York
Roman Catholic Archdiocese of New York
20th-century Roman Catholic church buildings in the United States